In analytic geometry, a line and a sphere can intersect in three ways:

 No intersection at all
 Intersection in exactly one point
 Intersection in two points.

Methods for distinguishing these cases, and determining the coordinates for the points in the latter cases, are useful in a number of circumstances. For example, it is a common calculation to perform during ray tracing.

Calculation using vectors in 3D 
In vector notation, the equations are as follows:

Equation for a sphere

 : points on the sphere
 : center point
 : radius of the sphere

Equation for a line starting at 

 : points on the line
 : origin of the line
 : distance from the origin of the line
 : direction of line (a non-zero vector)

Equations combined

Expanded and rearranged:

The form of a quadratic formula is now observable. (This quadratic equation is an instance of Joachimsthal's equation.)

where

Simplified

If , then it is clear that no solutions exist, i.e. the line does not intersect the sphere (case 1).
If , then exactly one solution exists, i.e. the line just touches the sphere in one point (case 2).
If , two solutions exist, and thus the line touches the sphere in two points (case 3).

See also
Intersection_(geometry)#A_line_and_a_circle
Analytic geometry
Line–plane intersection
Plane–plane intersection
Plane–sphere intersection

References 

Analytic geometry
Geometric algorithms
Geometric intersection
Spherical geometry